Raymond William Hatton (July 7, 1887 – October 21, 1971) was an American film actor who appeared in almost 500 motion pictures.

Biography
Hatton was born in Red Oak, Iowa. His physician father steered him toward a career in medicine. However, Hatton had become enamored of being on stage after he acted in a school play, and he left home to go into acting as a career.

Hatton was part of a vaudeville act that went to Hollywood in 1911. There, he established a successful silent film career, including a stint being paired in 1920s comedies with Wallace Beery. During the sound era, though, his career soon skidded and he usually played smaller supporting roles, including the tobacco-chewing, rowdy character Rusty Joslin in The Three Mesquiteers Western B picture series. By the 1950s, Hatton's acting roles expanded into television, where he appeared in various series, including the Adventures of Superman.

He has a star in the Motion Picture section of the Hollywood Walk of Fame at 1708 Vine Street.

Hatton died on October 21, 1971, in Palmdale, California, aged 84. He is interred at Joshua Memorial Park.

Selected filmography

Film

Tragic Love (1909, Short) – A Detective / In Factory
A Burglar's Mistake (1909, Short) – At Folsom's / Secretary
The Bangville Police (1913, Short) – Farm Hand (in vest)
That Ragtime Band (1913, Short) – Trumpet Player
The Squaw Man (1914) – Cowhand (uncredited)
The Circus Man (1914) – Ernie Cronk
The Girl of the Golden West (1915) – Castro
Young Romance (1915) – Jack
The Warrens of Virginia (1915) – Blake
The Unafraid (1915, Short) – Bosnian Valet
The Captive (1915) – Turkish Soldier (uncredited)
The Woman (1915) – Secretary
The Wild Goose Chase (1915, Short) – Mr. Wright
The Arab (1915) – Mysterious Messenger
Chimmie Fadden (1915, Short) – Larry, His Brother
Kindling (1915) – Steve Bates
The Case of Becky (1915) – Department Store Manager (uncredited)
Blackbirds (1915) – Hawke, Jr.
Carmen (1915) – Spectator at Bullfight (uncredited)
Armstrong's Wife (1915) – Runner
Chimmie Fadden Out West (1915) – Larry
At Bay (1915) – Minor Role (uncredited)
The Unknown (1915) – Second Private
The Cheat (1915) – Courtroom Spectator (uncredited)
The Immigrant (1915) – Munsing – Harding's Secretary
The Golden Chance (1915) – Jimmy The Rat
Temptation (1915) – Baron Cheurial
Tennessee's Pardner (1916) – Gewilliker Hay
To Have and to Hold (1916) – Nicolo
The Sowers (1916) – The Peddler
Public Opinion (1916) – Smith
The Honorable Friend (1916) – Kayosho
The Lash (1916) – Mr. Crawdon
Oliver Twist (1916) – The Artful Dodger
Joan the Woman (1916) – Charles VII
The American Consul (1917) – President Cavillo
A Romance of the Redwoods (1917) – Dick Roland
The Little American (1917) – Count Jules de Destin
What Money Can't Buy (1917) – King Stephen III
The Squaw Man's Son (1917) – Storekeeper
The Crystal Gazer (1917) – Phil Mannering
Hashimura Togo (1917) – Reporter
The Woman God Forgot (1917)  – Montezuma
The Secret Game (1917) – Mr. Harris
Nan of Music Mountain (1917) – Logan
The Devil-Stone (1917)
Jules of the Strong Heart (1918) – Ted Kendall
One More American (1918) – Bump Rundle
The Whispering Chorus (1918) – John Tremble
Old Wives for New (1918) – Beautician (uncredited)
We Can't Have Everything (1918) – Marquis Of Strathdene
The Firefly of France (1918) – The Firefly
Sandy (1918) – Ricks Wilson
Less Than Kin (1918) – James Emmons
The Source (1918) – Pop Sprowl
Arizona (1918) – Tony
The Dub (1919) – Phineas Driggs
Don't Change Your Husband (1919) – Phineas Driggs
Maggie Pepper (1919) – Jake Rothschild
The Poor Boob (1919) – Stephen Douglas
Experimental Marriage (1919) – Arthur Barnard
Johnny Get Your Gun (1919) – Milton C. Milton
For Better, for Worse (1919) – Bud
You're Fired (1919) – Orchestra Leader
Secret Service (1919) – Lieutenant Howard Varney
A Daughter of the Wolf (1919) – Doc
The Love Burglar (1919) – Parson Smith
Male and Female (1919) – Honorable Ernest Wolley
Everywoman (1919) – Honorable Ernest Wolley
Young Mrs. Winthrop (1920) – Nick Jones
The Dancin' Fool (1920) – Enoch Jones
The Sea Wolf (1920) – Thomas Mugridge, the Cook
Jes' Call Me Jim (1920) – Paul Benedict
Stop Thief! (1920) – James Cluney
Officer 666 (1920) – Whitney Barnes
Bunty Pulls the Strings (1921) – Weelum
The Concert (1921) – Dr. Hart
The Betrayer (1921)
Peck's Bad Boy (1921) – The Village Grocer
Salvage (1921) – The Cripple
The Ace of Hearts (1921) – The Menace
The Affairs of Anatol (1921) – Great Blatsky – Violin Teacher (uncredited)
 Pilgrims of the Night (1921) – Le Blun
 All's Fair in Love (1921) – Craigh Randolph
Doubling for Romeo (1921) – Steve Woods / Paris
Head over Heels (1922) – Pepper
His Back Against the Wall (1922) – Jeremy Dice
The Fast Freight (1922)
Pink Gods (1922) – Jim Wingate
Manslaughter (1922) – Brown
To Have and to Hold (1922) – King James I
Ebb Tide (1922) – J.L. Huish
The Hottentot (1922) – Swift
Java Head (1923) – Edward Dunsack
The Tie That Binds (1923) – Hiram Foster
Trimmed in Scarlet (1923) – Mr. Kipp
A Man of Action (1923) – Harry Hopwood
Three Wise Fools (1923) – Young Gaunt
The Barefoot Boy (1923) – Deacon Holloway
The Hunchback of Notre Dame (1923) (with Lon Chaney) – Gringoire
The Virginian (1923) – Shorty
Enemies of Children (1923)
Big Brother (1923) – Cokey Joe Miller
Half-A-Dollar-Bill (1924) – Noodles – the Cook
True as Steel (1924) – Great Grandfather
Triumph (1924) – A Tramp
The Fighting Adventurer (1924) – Denny Daynes and Po-Hsing-Chien
Cornered (1924) – Nick – the Dope
The Mine with the Iron Door (1924) – The Lizard
Tomorrow's Love (1925) – Brown
Adventure (1925) – Raff
The Devil's Cargo (1925) – Mate
The Top of the World (1925) – Capt. Preston
Contraband (1925) – Launcelot Bangs
The Thundering Herd (1925; with Noah Beery) – Jude Pilchuk
In the Name of Love (1925) – Marquis de Beausant
A Son of His Father (1925) – Charlie Grey
Lord Jim (1925) – Cornelius
Behind the Front (1926) (with Wallace Beery) – Shorty McKee
 Silence (1926) – Harry Silvers
Born to the West (1926) – Jim Fallon
Forlorn River (1926) – Arizona Pete
We're in the Navy Now (1926) – 'Stinky' Smith
Fashions for Women (1927) – Sam Dupont
Fireman, Save My Child (1927; with Wallace Beery) – Sam
Now We're in the Air (1927; with Wallace Beery and Louise Brooks) – Ray
Two Flaming Youths (1927) – Himself – as Beery and Hatton (uncredited)
Wife Savers (1928) – Rodney Ramsbottom
Partners in Crime (1928) – 'Scoop' McGee, The Reporter
The Big Killing (1928) – Deadeye Dan
The Office Scandal (1929) – Pearson, the City Editor
Trent's Last Case (1929) – Joshua Cupples
The Mighty (1929) – Dogey Franks
Hell's Heroes (1929) – 'Barbwire' Tom Gibbons
Murder on the Roof (1930) – Drinkwater
Midnight Mystery (1930) – Paul Cooper
Road to Paradise (190) – Nick
The Silver Horde (1930) – Fraser
Rogue of the Rio Grande (1930) – Pedro
Pineapples (1930)
The Lion and the Lamb (1931) – Muggsy
Woman Hungry (1931) – Joac
Honeymoon Lane (1931) – Dynamite
The Squaw Man (1931) – Shorty
Arrowsmith (1931) – Drunk (uncredited)
Stung (1931) – Dumb Juryman
Polly of the Circus (1932) – Downey
Law and Order (1932) – Deadwood
Stranger in Town (1932) – Elmer
Alias Mary Smith (1932) – Scoop
The Vanishing Frontier (1932) – Hornet O'Lowery
Cornered (1932) – Deputy Jacklin
Drifting Souls (1932) – Scoop
The Crooked Circle (1932) – Harmon (The Hermit)
The Fourth Horseman (1932) – Gabby – Tax Clerk
Exposed (1932) – Marty
Vanity Street (1932) – Shorty
Hidden Gold (1932) – Spike Webber
Malay Nights (1932) – Rance Danvers
Uptown New York (1932) – Slot Machine King
Long Loop Laramie (1932)
Terror Trail (1933) – Lucky Dawson
State Trooper (1933) – Carter
The Thundering Herd (1933) – Jude Pilchuck
Under the Tonto Rim (1933) – Porky
The Three Musketeers (1933, Serial) (with John Wayne) – Renard
The Big Cage (1933) – Timothy O'Hara
Penthouse (1933) – Bodyguard
Day of Reckoning (1933) – Hart
The Women in His Life (1933) – Curly
Lady Killer (1933) – Pete
Alice in Wonderland (1933) – Mouse
Lazy River (1934) – Capt. Herbert Orkney
The Defense Rests (1934) – Louie
Fifteen Wives (1934) – Det. Sgt. Meade
Straight Is the Way (1934) – Mendel
Once to Every Bachelor (1934) – Uncle John
Peck's Bad Boy (1934) – Minor Role (uncredited)
Wagon Wheels (1934) – Jim Burch
Red Morning (1934) – Hawker
Rustlers of Red Dog (1935, Serial) – Laramie
Times Square Lady (1935) – 'Slim' Kennedy
Princess O'Hara (1935) – Frying Pan (uncredited)
G Men (1935) – Gangsters' Messenger with Warning
Murder in the Fleet (1935) – Al Duval (uncredited)
Calm Yourself (1935) – Mike
The Daring Young Man (1935) – Flaherty
Steamboat Round the Bend (1935) – Matt Abel
Wanderer of the Wasteland (1935) – Merryvale
Stormy (1935) – Stuffy
Nevada (1935) – Sheriff
Exclusive Story (1936) – City Editor
Timothy's Quest (1936) – Jabe Doolittle
Laughing Irish Eyes (1936) – Gallagher
Desert Gold (1936) – Doc Belding
Undersea Kingdom (1936) – Gasspon
Fury (1936) – Hector – Barber (uncredited)
The Arizona Raiders (1936) – Tracks Williams
Women Are Trouble (1936) – Joe Murty
The Vigilantes Are Coming (1936, Serial) – Whipsaw
Yellowstone (1936) – Old Pete
Mad Holiday (1936) – 'Cokey Joe' Ferris
Sinner Take All (1936) – Hotel Clerk
Jungle Jim (1937, Serial) – Malay Mike
Marked Woman (1937) – Vanning's Lawyer
Fly-Away Baby (1937) – Maxie Monkhouse
Roaring Timber (1937) – 'Tennessee'
Public Wedding (1937) – The Deacon
Love Is on the Air (1937) – Weston
Over the Goal (1937) – Deputy Abner
The Adventurous Blonde (1937) – Maxie
Missing Witnesses (1937) – 'Little Joe' Macey
The Bad Man of Brimstone (1937; with Wallace Beery) – Cal Turner (uncredited)
He Couldn't Say No (1938) – Hymie Atlas, a Gangster
Over the Wall (1938) – Convict
Love Finds Andy Hardy (1938) – Peter Dugan
The Texans (1938) – Cal Tuttle
Touchdown, Army (1938) – Bob Haskins
Come On, Rangers (1938) – Jeff
Tom Sawyer, Detective (1938) – Judge Tyler
Ambush (1939) – Mosher – Hardware Storekeeper (uncredited)
Paris Honeymoon (1939) – Huskins
Persons in Hiding (1939) – Hadley (uncredited)
Rough Riders' Round-up (1939) – Rusty Coburn
I'm from Missouri (1939) – Darryl Coffee, Mule Breeder
Frontier Pony Express (1939) – Horseshoe
Undercover Doctor (1939) – Dizzy Warner
6,000 Enemies (1939) – 'Wibbie' Yern
Wyoming Outlaw (1939) (with John Wayne) – Rusty Joslin
Career (1939) – Deacon
Wall Street Cowboy (1939) – Chuckawalla
New Frontier (1939) (with John Wayne) – Rusty Joslin
The Kansas Terrors (1939) – Rusty Joslin
Cowboys from Texas (1939) – Rusty Joslin
Heroes of the Saddle (1940) – Rusty Joslin
Pioneers of the West (1940) – Rusty Joslin
Hi-Yo Silver (1940) – Smokey (uncredited)
Covered Wagon Days (1940) – Rusty Joslin
Rocky Mountain Rangers (1940) – Rusty Joslin
Queen of the Mob (1940) – Herb – Auto Camp Proprietor
Kit Carson (1940) – Jim Bridger
Oklahoma Renegades (1940) – Rusty
White Eagle (1941, Serial) – Grizzly
Arizona Bound (1941) – Marshal Sandy Hopkins
Forbidden Trails (1941) – Sandy Hopkins
Texas (1941) – Abilene Judge (uncredited)
Forbidden Trails (1941) – Marshal Sandy Hopkins aka Killer
Cadets on Parade (1942) – Gus Novak
Below the Border (1942) – Marshal Sandy – aka Killer
Reap the Wild Wind (1942) – Master Shipwright
Ghost Town Law (1942) – Marshal Sandy Hopkins – aka Killer
The Girl from Alaska (1942) – Shorty
Down Texas Way (1942) – U.S. Marshal Sandy Hopkins
The Affairs of Martha (1942) – Patrolling Beach Cleaner (uncredited)
Her Cardboard Lover (1942) – George the Bailiff (uncredited)
Pierre of the Plains (1942) – Pete (uncredited)
Riders of the West (1942) – Marshal Sandy Hopkins
West of the Law (1942) – Marshal Sandy Hopkins
Dawn on the Great Divide (1942) – Marshal Sandy Hopkins
Prairie Chickens (1943) – Jefferson Gilbert
The Ghost Rider (1943) – Marshal Sandy Hopkins
The Stranger from Pecos (1943) – Marshal Sandy Hopkins
Six Gun Gospel (1943) – Marshal Sandy Hopkins
Outlaws of Stampede Pass (1943) – Marshal Sandy Hopkins
The Texas Kid (1943) – Marshal Sandy Hopkins
Raiders of the Border (1944) –  Marshal Sandy Hopkins
Partners of the Trail (1944) – Marshal Sandy Hopkins
Law Men (1944) – Marshal Sandy Hopkins
Range Law (1944) – Marshal Sandy Hopkins
West of the Rio Grande (1944) – Marshal Sandy Hopkins
Land of the Outlaws (1944) – Marshal Sandy Hopkins
Tall in the Saddle (1944) (With John Wayne) – Zeke
Law of the Valley (1944) – Marshal Sandy Hopkins
Ghost Guns (1944) – Marshal Sandy Hopkins
The Navajo Trail (1945) – Marshal Sandy Hopkins
Gun Smoke (1945) – Marshal Sandy Hopkins
Stranger from Santa Fe (1945) – Marshal Sandy Hopkins
Flame of the West (1945) – Add Youman
Rhythm Round-Up (1945) – Noah Jones
Sunbonnet Sue (1945) – Joe Feeney
The Lost Trail (1945) – Marshal Sandy Hopkins posing as Trigger
Northwest Trail (1945) – Morgan – Bartender
Frontier Feud (1945) – Marshal Sandy Hopkins
Border Bandits (1946) – Marshal Sandy Hopkins
Drifting Along  (1946) – Pawnee Jones
The Haunted Mine (1946) – Marshal Sandy Hopkins
Under Arizona Skies (1946) – Santa Fe Jones
The Gentleman from Texas (1946) – Idaho Foster
Trigger Fingers (1946) – Pinto Peters
Shadows on the Range (1946) – Dusty Cripps
Rolling Home (1946) – Pop Miller
Silver Range (1946) – Tucson Smith
Raiders of the South (1947) – Shorty Kendall
Valley of Fear (1947) – 'Rusty' Peters
Trailing Danger (1947) – Waco
Land of the Lawless (1947) – Bodie
The Law Comes to Gunsight (1947) – Reno
Code of the Saddle (1947) – Winks
Flashing Guns (1947) – Amos Shelby
Black Gold (1947) – Bucky
Unconquered (1947) – Venango Scout
Prairie Express (1947) – Faro Jenkins
Gun Talk (1947) – Lucky Danvers
Overland Trails (1948) – Dusty Hanover
Crossed Trails (1948) – Bodie Clark
Frontier Agent (1948) – Cappy
Triggerman (1948) – Rusty Steele
Back Trail (1948) – Casoose
The Fighting Film (1948) – Banty
The Sheriff of Medicine Bow (1948) – Banty Prentiss
Gunning for Justice (1948) – Banty
Hidden Danger (1948) – Juniper
The Daltons' Women (1950) – Sheriff Doolin
Hostile Country (1950) – Colonel Patrict
Marshal of Heldorado (1950) – Colonel
Operation Haylift (1950) – Sandy Cameron
Crooked River (1950) – Colonel
Colorado Ranger (1950) – The Colonel
West of the Brazos (1950) – The Colonel
Fast on the Draw (1950) – Colonel
County Fair (1950) – Sad Sam
Skipalong Rosenbloom (1951) – Granpappy Tex Rosenbloom
Kentucky Jubilee (1951) – Ben White
The Golden Hawk (1952) – Barnaby Stoll
Cow Country (1953) – Smokey
Thunder Pass (1954) – Ancient
Treasure of Ruby Hills (1955) – Westbrook 'Scotty' Scott
The Twinkle in God's Eye (1955) – Yahoo Man
Dig That Uranium (1955) – Hank 'Mac' McKenzie
Day the World Ended (1955) – Pete
Girls in Prison (1956) – Pop Carson
Flesh and the Spur (1956) – Windy Wagonwheels
Shake, Rattle & Rock! (1956) – Horace Fitzdingle
Invasion of the Saucer Men (1957) – Farmer Larkin
Pawnee (1957)  – Obie Dilks
Motorcycle Gang (1957) – Uncle Ed
Alaska Passage (1959) – Prospector Hank
The Quick Gun (1964) – Elderly Man
Requiem for a Gunfighter (1965) – Hoops
In Cold Blood (1967) – Elderly Hitchhiker

Television

The Cisco Kid – episode – Medicine Flats – Sheriff (1950)
The Cisco Kid – episode – Rustling – Sheriff (1950)
Dick Tracy – episodes – The Mole: Parts 1–3 & The Payroll Robbery – The Mole (1950)
Adventures of Wild Bill Hickok – episode – The Slocum Family – Pa Slocum (1951)
Adventures of Wild Bill Hickok – episode – Indian Bureau Story – Seth Rossen (1951)
The Cisco Kid – episode – Canyon City Kid – Gramps (1952)
The Cisco Kid – episode – The Puppeteer – Uncle Gitano (1952)
Adventures of Wild Bill Hickok – episode – Jingles Becomes a Baby Sitter – Webley (1952) 
The Abbott and Costello Show – episode – The Music Lover – Mr. Brooke (1953)
The Cisco Kid – episode – Three Suspects – Morgan (1954)
The Cisco Kid – episode – Mining Madness – Jeff Hanby (1954)
Adventures of Wild Bill Hickok – episode – Ol' Pardner Rides Again – Josh Ledbetter (1954)
Adventures of Superman – episode – The Bully of Dry Gulch – Sagebrush (1955)
Adventures of Wild Bill Hickok – episode – The Golden Rainbow – Moses Martin (1955) 
Adventures of Wild Bill Hickok – episode – Old Cowboys Never Die – Herman (1955)
Adventures of Superman – episode – Dagger Island – Jonathan Crag / Craymore (1956)
Adventures of Wild Bill Hickok – episode – Jingles Gets the Bird – Cap'n Ben (1956) 
Adventures of Superman – episode – The Prince Albert Coat – Grandfather Jackson (1957) 
Leave it to Beaver – episode – The Clubhouse – Charlie the Fireman (1957) 
The Rough Riders – episode – The Counterfeiters – Osgood (1958) 
Death Valley Days – episode – Auto Intoxication (1958)
Maverick – episode   – Burial Ground of the Gods – Stableman (1958) 
Cheyenne – episode – The Gamble – Mousey (1958) 
Tombstone Territory – episode – Gun Hostage – Esau Stellings (1959) 
Bat Masterson – episode – A Personal Matter – Adam Fairbanks (Gunsmith) (1959)
Maverick – episode  – Royal Four Flush – Harry (1959)
The Red Skelton Hour – episode – San Fernando in Alaska – Buck (1959) 
The Donna Reed Show – episode – The Broken Spirit – Mr. Barnhill (1960)
Wanted: Dead or Alive – episode – A House Divided – Stableman (1960) (uncredited)
Have Gun – Will Travel – episode – The Trial – Perce Weber (Bounty Hunter)  (1960)
Have Gun – Will Travel – episode – Full Circle – Eph Trager (1960)
Maverick – episode – The Marquessa – Charlie Plank (1960; with Jack Kelly) 
Shotgun Slade – episode – Street of Terror – Tanner (1960) 
Gunsmoke – episode – Moo Moo Raid – Onie (1960) 
Have Gun – Will Travel – episode – The Tax Gatherer – Mayor Trevor (1961) 
Whispering Smith – episode – Three for One – Locksmith (1961)

Lobby card

References

External links

Raymond Hatton at Virtual History

1880s births
1971 deaths
American male film actors
American male silent film actors
20th-century American male actors
Male actors from Iowa
People from Red Oak, Iowa
People from Palmdale, California
Vaudeville performers
Western (genre) television actors
Male Western (genre) film actors